The 1991–92 Rugby League Premiership was the 18th end of season Rugby League Premiership competition.

The winners were Wigan.

First round

Replay

Semi-finals

Final

References

Sources

1992 in English rugby league